South Boulder is a mixed-use suburb of Kalgoorlie-Boulder, a city in the Eastern Goldfields region of Western Australia.

It contains the Old Boulder Cemetery. It has a large residential area immediately south of the Boulder townsite and also contains Eastern Goldfields Regional Prison on its outskirts.

References